George Pelton Lawrence (May 19, 1859 – November 21, 1917) was a member of the United States House of Representatives from Massachusetts.

Early life and education
Born in Adams, Massachusetts, Lawrence was the son of Dr. George C. Lawrence and his wife, Jane E. Pelton, and also the nephew of New York City Congressman Guy Ray Pelton.  He graduated from Drury Academy in 1876 and from Amherst College in 1880.  Lawrence studied law at the Columbia Law School.
On June 12, 1889, Pelton married Susannah Hope Bracewell (1866-1914).

Legal career
Lawrence was admitted to the bar in 1883 and commenced practice in North Adams.

Public service

Judgeship
Lawrence was appointed judge of the judicial district of northern Berkshire, County in 1885.  Lawrence resigned his judgeship in 1894 upon being elected to the Massachusetts Senate.

Massachusetts Senate
Lawrence served in the senate from 1895 to 1897 and was its President, in 1896 and 1897.

Congressional service
Lawrence was elected as a Republican to the Fifty-fifth Congress to fill the vacancy caused by the death of Ashley B. Wright. Lawrence was reelected to the Fifty-sixth and to the six succeeding Congresses and served from November 2, 1897, to March 3, 1913. While in Congress Lawrence was chairman of the Committee on Expenditures in the Department of War (Fifty-ninth through Sixty-first Congresses).

Post Congressional career
Lawrence was not a candidate for renomination in 1912, and from July 1 to September 17, 1913 was a member of the Massachusetts Public Service Commission.

Death
Lawrence jumped from an eighth-floor window and fell to his death, at the Belmont Hotel, New York, New York; interment was in Hillside Cemetery, North Adams.

See also
 117th Massachusetts General Court (1896)

References

Bibliography 
 Who's Who in State Politics, 1908 Practical Politics  (1908) p. 15.
 

1859 births
1917 suicides
People from Adams, Massachusetts
Suicides by jumping in New York City
American politicians who committed suicide
Republican Party Massachusetts state senators
Presidents of the Massachusetts Senate
Amherst College alumni
Columbia Law School alumni
Massachusetts lawyers
Republican Party members of the United States House of Representatives from Massachusetts
19th-century American politicians
19th-century American lawyers